The Canadian Tire Para Hockey Cup, formerly the World Sledge Hockey Challenge (WSHC) is an annual international ice sledge hockey tournament sponsored by Hockey Canada and the IPC Sledge Hockey. The tournament is an invitational format to bring four of the strongest ice sledge hockey teams together for international competition.

The tournament features four teams per year and has seen teams from Canada, the United States, Norway, Russia, South Korea, Japan, Italy, Germany, and the Czech Republic.

History
The tournament was created in 2007 by Hockey Canada. The idea behind the tournament was to give an opportunity for international level play during non-Paralympic years.

The inaugural 2007 tournament was hosted in Kelowna, British Columbia, and featured four teams – Canada , Norway, United States and Germany. Canada captured the inaugural tournament, by defeating Norway 1-0 in overtime in the gold medal game.

The 2008 tournament was held in Charlottetown, Prince Edward Island. Japan replaced Germany. For the second straight year, Canada defeated Norway in the final. However, Canada dominated the final winning 7-0

In 2009, the United States won their first title. They defeated Canada in overtime 3-2 in Charlottetown, Prince Edward Island. No tournament was held in 2010, owing to the 2010 Winter Paralympics held in Vancouver, British Columbia that year. Instead, two tournaments were held in 2011, in April in London, Ontario, Canada defeated Norway in the final 8-0. In the November tournament that year in Calgary, Alberta, Canada again captured Gold, defeating the United States 4-1 in the final. The 2012 tournament was held again in Calgary, Alberta and saw the United States capture their second gold, defeating Canada 1-0 in the final.

In 2013, the tournament saw a few changes, it was held in Toronto, Ontario for the first time and saw Russia and South Korea replace Japan and Norway in the tournament. South Korea was added in an attempt to help them gain experience before the 2018 Winter Paralympics are held there. Canada captured gold, by defeating the United States 4-1 in the final. Again owing to the 2014 Winter Paralympics in Sochi, Russia no tournament was held. It returned in 2015 in Leduc, Alberta.

Champions

Medal table

All-time team records
Up to date as of May 2021

See also
Para ice hockey at the Winter Paralympics
International Paralympic Committee
World Para Ice Hockey Championships
Sledge hockey

References

External links
World Sledge Hockey Challenge

Hockey Canada
Sledge hockey competitions